Mount Washington is a mountain in New Hampshire.

Mount Washington may also refer to:

Places

Mountains
List of peaks named Mount Washington

Communities in the United States
 Mount Washington, Los Angeles, California
 Mount Washington, Kentucky
 Mount Washington, Baltimore, Maryland
 Mount Washington, Massachusetts
 Mount Washington, Cincinnati, Ohio
 Mount Washington, Pittsburgh, Pennsylvania

Ships
 MS Mount Washington, a vessel on Lake Winnipesaukee, New Hampshire, U.S.
 USS Mount Washington, the name of two ships
 SS Mount Washington (T-AOT 5076), a transport oiler

Other uses 
 Mount Washington Alpine Resort, a resort in British Columbia
 Mount Washington Cog Railway, New Hampshire
 Mount Washington College, a former college in New Hampshire
 Mount Washington Hotel, a hotel in New Hampshire
 Mount Washington Regional Airport, an airport in Whitefield, New Hampshire
 Mount Washington State Park, a park at the summit of Mt. Washington in New Hampshire
 Mount Washington Auto Road, a New Hampshire tourist destination since 1861
 Mount Washington station, a rail station in Baltimore, Maryland
 Mount Washington State Forest, a forest in Massachusetts
 Mount Washington Wilderness, a wilderness area in Oregon

See also

 Washington (disambiguation)